The Early Triassic is the first of three epochs of the Triassic Period of the geologic timescale. It spans the time between  Ma and  Ma (million years ago). Rocks from this epoch are collectively known as the Lower Triassic Series, which is a unit in chronostratigraphy. 

The Early Triassic is the oldest epoch of the Mesozoic Era. It is preceded by the Lopingian Epoch (late Permian, Paleozoic Era) and followed by the Middle Triassic Epoch. The Early Triassic is divided into the Induan and Olenekian ages. The Induan is subdivided into the Griesbachian and Dienerian subages and the Olenekian is subdivided into the Smithian and Spathian subages. 

The Lower Triassic series is coeval with the Scythian Stage, which is today not included in the official timescales but can be found in older literature. In Europe, most of the Lower Triassic is composed of Buntsandstein, a lithostratigraphic unit of continental red beds.

The Early Triassic and partly also the Middle Triassic span the interval of biotic recovery from the Permian-Triassic extinction event, the most severe mass extinction event in Earth's history. A second extinction event, the Smithian-Spathian boundary event, occurred during the Olenekian. A third extinction event occurred at the Olenekian-Anisian boundary, marking the end of the Early Triassic epoch.

Early Triassic climate

The climate during the Early Triassic Epoch (especially in the interior of the supercontinent Pangaea) was generally arid, rainless and dry and deserts were widespread; however the poles possessed a temperate climate. The pole-to-equator temperature gradient was temporally flat during the Early Triassic and may have allowed tropical species to extend their distribution poleward. This is evidenced by the global distribution of ammonoids. 

The mostly hot climate of the Early Triassic may have been caused by late volcanic eruptions of the Siberian Traps, which had probably triggered the Permian-Triassic extinction event and accelerated the rate of global warming into the Triassic. Studies suggest that Early Triassic climate was very volatile, punctuated by a number of relatively rapid global temperature changes, marine anoxic events, and carbon cycle disturbances, which led to subsequent extinction events in the aftermath of the Permian-Triassic extinction event. On the other hand, an alternative hypothesis proposes these Early Triassic climatic perturbations and biotic upheavals that inhibited the recovery of life following the P-T mass extinction to have been linked to forcing driven by changes in the Earth's obliquity defined by a roughly 32.8 thousand year periodicity with strong 1.2 million year modulations. According to proponents of this hypothesis, radiometric dating indicates that major activity from the Siberian Traps ended very shortly after the end-Permian extinction and did not span the entire Early Triassic epoch, thus not being the primary culprit for the climatic changes throughout this epoch.

Early Triassic life

Fauna and flora
The Triassic Period opened with the Permian-Triassic extinction event. The massive extinctions that ended the Permian Period and Paleozoic Era caused extreme hardships for the surviving species. 

The Early Triassic Epoch saw the recovery of life after the biggest mass extinction event of the past, which took millions of years due to the severity of the event and the harsh Early Triassic climate. Many types of corals, brachiopods, molluscs, echinoderms, and other invertebrates had disappeared. The Permian vegetation dominated by Glossopteris in the southern hemisphere ceased to exist. Other groups, such as Actinopterygii, appear to have been less affected by this extinction event and body size was not a selective factor during the extinction event. Different patterns of recovery are evident on land and in the sea. Early Triassic faunas lacked biodiversity and were relatively homogeneous due to the effects of the extinction. The ecological recovery on land took 30 million years.

Terrestrial biota
The most common land vertebrate was the small herbivorous synapsid Lystrosaurus. Often interpreted as a disaster taxon (although this view was questioned), Lystrosaurus had a wide range across Pangea. In the southern part of the supercontinent, it co-occurred with the non-mammalian cynodonts Galesaurus and Thrinaxodon, early relatives of mammals. First archosauriforms appeared, such as Erythrosuchus (Olenekian-Ladinian). This group includes the ancestors of crocodiles and dinosaurs (including birds). Fossilized foot prints of dinosauromorphs are known from the Olenekian. 

The flora was gymnosperm-dominated at the onset of the Triassic, but changed rapidly and became lycopod-dominated (e.g. Pleuromeia) during the Griesbachian-Dienerian ecological crisis. This change coincided with the extinction of the Permian Glossopteris flora. In the Spathian subage, the flora changed back to gymnosperm and pteridophyte dominated. These shifts reflect global changes in precipitation and temperature. Floral diversity was overall very low during the Early Triassic, as plant life had yet to fully recover from the Permian-Triassic extinction.

Microbially induced sedimentary structures (MISS) are common in the fossil record of North China in the immediate aftermath of the Permian-Triassic extinction, indicating that microbial mats dominated local terrestrial ecosystems following the Permian-Triassic boundary. The regional prevalence of MISS is attributable to a decrease in bioturbation and grazing pressure as a result of aridification and temperature increase. The disappearance of MISS later in the Early Triassic has been interpreted as a signal of increased bioturbation and recovery of terrestrial ecosystems.

Aquatic biota
In the oceans, the most common Early Triassic hard-shelled marine invertebrates were bivalves, gastropods, ammonites, echinoids, and a few articulate brachiopods. Conodonts experienced a revival in diversity following a nadir during the Permian. The first oysters appeared in the Early Triassic. They grew on the shells of living ammonoids as epizoans. Microbial reefs were common, possibly due to lack of competition with metazoan reef builders as a result of the extinction. However, transient metazoan reefs reoccurred during the Olenekian wherever permitted by environmental conditions. Ammonoids show blooms followed by extinctions during the Early Triassic.

Aquatic vertebrates diversified after the extinction. 

Fishes: Typical Triassic ray-finned fishes, such as Australosomus, Birgeria, Bobasatrania, Boreosomus, Pteronisculus, Parasemionotidae and  Saurichthys appeared close to the Permian-Triassic boundary, whereas neopterygians diversified later during the Triassic. Many species of fish had a global distribution during the Early Triassic. Coelacanths show a peak in their diversity and new modes of life (Rebellatrix). Chondrichthyes are represented by Hybodontiformes like Palaeobates, Omanoselache, Lissodus, some Neoselachii, as well as last survivors of Eugeneodontida (Caseodus, Fadenia). 

Amphibians: Relatively large, marine temnospondyl amphibians, such as Aphaneramma or Wantzosaurus, were geographically widespread during the Induan and Olenekian ages. The fossils of these crocodile-shaped amphibians were found in Greenland, Spitsbergen, Pakistan and Madagascar. 

Reptiles: In the oceans, first marine reptiles appeared during the Early Triassic. Their descendants ruled the oceans during the Mesozoic. Hupehsuchia, Ichthyopterygia and sauropterygians are among the first marine reptiles to enter the scene in the Olenekian (e.g. Cartorhynchus, Chaohusaurus, Utatsusaurus, Hupehsuchus, Grippia, Omphalosaurus, Corosaurus). Other marine reptiles such as Tanystropheus, Helveticosaurus, Atopodentatus, placodonts or the thalattosaurs followed later in the Middle Triassic. The Anisian aged ichthyosaur Thalattoarchon was one of the first marine macropredators capable of eating prey that was similar in size to itself, an ecological role that can be compared to that of modern orcas.

Fossil gallery

See also 
 Geologic time scale
 Triassic
 Mass extinction

References

Further reading

External links 
 GeoWhen Database - Early Triassic
 Palaeos
 scotese

 
01
Geological epochs
01

de:Buntsandstein